Yakubu Mohammed may refer to:
Yakubu Mohammed (footballer, born 1990), Nigerian football forward
Yakubu Mohammed (footballer, born 1996), Nigerian football defender

See also
Yakubu Muhammed (born 1973), Nigerian film actor, producer, director, singer and scriptwriter